Toljevac, in Serbian Cyrillic Тољевац, is a village in Serbia, situated in the municipality of Varvarin, and the district of Rasina. In 2002, it had 758 inhabitants.

External links 
 Toljevac

Populated places in Rasina District